The 2007–08 Biathlon World Cup – World Cup 5 was the fifth event of the season and was held in Ruhpolding, Germany, from January 9 until January 13, 2008.

Schedule of events

Medal winners

Men

Women

References

5
January 2008 sports events in Europe
2008 in German sport
2008,Biathlon World Cup - World Cup 5
World Cup - World Cup 5,2007-08
Sports competitions in Bavaria